German submarine U-410 was a Type VIIC U-boat built for Nazi Germany's Kriegsmarine during World War II, operating mainly in the Mediterranean. Her insignia was a sword & shield, she did not suffer any casualties until she was sunk.

U-410 was first commanded by Kapitänleutnant Kurt Sturm during her working up/training period and on her first patrol before being commanded by Horst-Arno Fenski for her six combat patrols. U-410 sank seven merchantmen, a Landing ship, Tank (LST); and a light cruiser during the Second World War. For his successes, Fenski received the Knight's Cross.

Design

German Type VIIC submarines were preceded by the shorter Type VIIB submarines. U-410 had a displacement of  when at the surface and  while submerged. She had two shafts and two  propellers.

The boat had a complement of between forty-four and sixty.

She carried two eight-man, one six-man and 58 one-man, rubber boats.

Service history
U-410 was ordered by the Kriegsmarine on 30 October 1939. She was laid down at the Danziger Werft yard in Danzig, on 9 January 1941 and launched on 14 October 1941. She was formally commissioned into the Kriegsmarine, on 23 February 1942.

1st and 2nd patrols
U-410 departed Kiel on 27 August 1942 for her first patrol. The U-boat, under Kapitänleutnant Kurt Sturm, sank the British Newton Pine in mid-Atlantic. She then arrived in St. Nazaire in France on 28 October 1942, after 63 days at sea.

Her second outing was not so productive; after 33 days she returned to her French base empty-handed.

3rd and 4th patrols
Her third foray was more productive and included the sinking of the British ship Fort Battle River on 6 March 1943. She also damaged another British vessel in the same engagement, Fort Paskoyac. Both of these ships were attacked southwest of Portugal. The U-boat returned to St. Nazaire on 27 March 1943.

Her fourth sortie included transiting the heavily defended Strait of Gibraltar. She arrived in La Spezia in Italy on 13 May 1943, having left St. Nazaire on 26 April.

5th and 6th patrols
U-410 left La Spezia on 7 August 1943 and attacked the convoy UGS-14 off the Algerian coast. Firing three torpedoes in a 'spread', she hit and sank two American ships, John Bell and Richard Henderson on 26 August 1943. She then sailed to Toulon in France, arriving on 30 August.

The U-boat tried to disrupt the landings at Anzio, sinking a British light cruiser and an American LST (see below).

Combat history

Commanders
23 February 1942 – 4 February 1943 Kapitänleutnant Kurt Sturm.
5 February 1943 – 11 March 1944 Oberleutnant zur See Horst-Arno Fenski

Flotillas
23 February – 31 August 1942 - 5th U-boat Flotilla
1 September 1942 – 31 May 1943 - 7th U-boat Flotilla
1 June 1943 – 11 March 1944 - 29th U-boat Flotilla

Wolfpacks
U-410 was part of the following "wolfpacks":

Rescue of survivors from MV Rhakotis
The survivors were returned to St. Nazaire the next day. Among the survivors were two Englishmen who received a special guard.

Sinking of HMS Penelope

A torpedo struck the British cruiser in the aft engine room; sixteen minutes later, U-410 fired another torpedo that hit Penelope in her boiler room, causing her immediate sinking. 415 of the crew, including the captain, went down with the ship. There were 206 survivors.
The cruiser was making  when she was hit, the fastest ship ever successfully attacked by a submarine.

Sinking of USS LST-348
On 20 February 1944 LST-348 (Landing Ship, Tank) was returning from Sicily, supporting Operation Shingle and roughly 40 miles South of Naples when she was spotted by U-410, who fired two torpedoes at around 02:00 hrs. Both hit the vessel on her port side, she sank 20 minutes later.

Loss
Three of the crew were killed as they scuttled the boat, but Fenski survived and spent two years in a US POW camp.

Summary of raiding history

References

Notes

Citations

Bibliography

External links

 Photos of U-410 and her crew
 BBC A peoples War - John Alexander MN

German Type VIIC submarines
World War II submarines of Germany
1941 ships
U-boats commissioned in 1941
U-boats sunk in 1944
U-boats sunk by US aircraft
Ships built in Danzig
Maritime incidents in March 1944